The 1970 NASCAR Grand National Series season began on Sunday January 18 and ended on Sunday November 22. Bobby Isaac was the champion of the series as NASCAR transitioned from the Grand National era to the Winston Cup era. Only one foreigner was racing that year, a Canadian named Frog Fagan (who finished 96th in the championship standings). It was also the last NASCAR national touring series season to feature a dirt track race until the 2013 NASCAR Camping World Truck Series, and the last time the Cup series raced on dirt until the 2021 NASCAR Cup Series.

Schedule

Races

Daytona 500

The 1970 Daytona 500 was a stock car automobile race run on February 22, 1970, and was the second race for the winged Plymouth Superbird. Pete Hamilton won the race in a Plymouth Superbird.

40- Pete Hamilton
17- David Pearson
22- Bobby Allison -1
99- Charlie Glotzbach -1
71- Bobby Isaac -2
14- Richard Brickhouse -2
59- Jim Hurtubise -3
7- Ramo Stott -6
98- LeeRoy Yarbrough -7
30- Dave Marcis -7

Alabama 500

The 1970 Alabama 500 was held on April 12, 1970, at Alabama International Motor Speedway. Pete Hamilton won his second race of the season.

40- Pete Hamilton
71- Bobby Isaac
17- David Pearson
72- Benny Parsons
21- Cale Yarborough
14- Freddy Fryar
43- Richard Petty
48- James Hylton
06- Neil Castles
07- Coo Coo Marlin

Rebel 400

The 1970 Rebel 400 was a NASCAR Grand National Series race that took place in May 1970 at Darlington Raceway in South Carolina. David Pearson won the race in 3:05:07. Richard Petty had a huge crash on the homestretch, which inspired the window net that is now mandated by NASCAR.

17- David Pearson
32- Dick Brooks -3
71- Bobby Isaac -7
48- James Hylton -9
72- Benny Parsons -11
5- Buddy Arrington -19
37- Don Tarr -21
46- Roy Mayne -24
25- Jabe Thomas -26
54- Bill Dennis -30

Georgia 500

The 1970 Georgia 500 is a NASCAR Grand National race that took place on November 8, 1970, at Middle Georgia Raceway in Macon, Georgia. Richard Petty (racing for Petty Enterprises) defeated Bobby Isaac by fourteen seconds.

43- Richard Petty
71- Bobby Isaac
32- Dick Brooks  -2
22- Bobby Allison  -3
4- John Sears  -13
48- James Hylton  -15
72- Benny Parsons  -15
64- Elmo Langley  -17
25- Jabe Thomas  -18
24- Cecil Gordon  -25

American 500

The 1970 American 500 was a 500-mile race that took place on November 15, 1970, at the North Carolina Motor Speedway in Rockingham, North Carolina. Cale Yarborough was the winner of the race.

21- Cale Yarborough
17- David Pearson
22- Bobby Allison -3
27- Donnie Allison -6
6- Buddy Baker -7
43- Richard Petty -11
71- Bobby Isaac -14
48- James Hylton -23
39- Friday Hassler -28
13- Buddy Young -28

Tidewater 300

The 1970 Tidewater 300 was the final NASCAR race held during its Grand National era. Held at the Langley Field Speedway in Hampton, Virginia (.395 mile paved oval track), the race was decided in a time of one hour and forty minutes with Bobby Allison as the race winner. There were 2 cautions (for 10 laps) and 3,200 people attended this race.

22- Bobby Allison
72- Benny Parsons
32- Pete Hamilton -1
4- John Sears -2
48- James Hylton -3
06- Neil Castles -5
64- Elmo Langley -7
70- J. D. McDuffie -7
79- Frank Warren -10
25- Jabe Thomas -10

Final points standings

Driver's standings

References

 Racing Reference – 1970 Grand National Results
 1970 Grand National Standings
 1970 American 500
 1970 Tidewater 300

 
NASCAR Cup Series seasons